New Orleans Station is a census-designated place (CDP) covering the residential population of the Naval Air Station Joint Reserve Base New Orleans in Plaquemines Parish, Louisiana, United States.  

It first appeared as a CDP in the 2020 census with a population of 2,508.

Demographics

Note: the US Census treats Hispanic/Latino as an ethnic category. This table excludes Latinos from the racial categories and assigns them to a separate category. Hispanics/Latinos can be of any race.

References

Census-designated places in Plaquemines Parish, Louisiana